Agur (lit. Crane), pronounced ʻAoor, is a moshav in central Israel. Located near Beit Shemesh, it falls under the jurisdiction of Mateh Yehuda Regional Council.

History
The village was established in 1950 by immigrants from Yemen on land that had belonged to the Palestinian village of Ajjur, which was occupied and depopulated  in October 1948 by the Fourth Battalion of the Giv'ati Brigade as part of Operation Yoav. In 1953 the founders left to establish another moshav, Nahala; Agur was repopulated by immigrants from the Kurdish areas of Turkey.

Economy
Today Agur operates its own winery, producing wine from four blends – blanca, rose, kessem, and special reserve.   Grapes from each vineyard in the Judean Mountains are fermented separately before being blended. The owner and founder of the winery is Shuki Yashuv.

See also
Israeli wine

References

Kurdish-Jewish culture in Israel
Iranian-Jewish culture in Israel
Iraqi-Jewish culture in Israel
Moshavim
Populated places established in 1950
Populated places in Jerusalem District
Mateh Yehuda Regional Council
Yemeni-Jewish culture in Israel